Malcolm McNaughtan Bowie FBA (5 May 1943 – 28 January 2007) was a British academic, and Master of Christ's College, Cambridge from 2002 to 2006. An acclaimed scholar of French literature, Bowie wrote several books on Marcel Proust, as well as books on Mallarmé, Lacan, and psychoanalysis.

Born in Aldeburgh, Suffolk, Bowie attended Woodbridge School, and then studied at the University of Edinburgh where he gained an MA in 1965. He was awarded a DPhil at the University of Sussex in 1970. His research fields were French literature, psychoanalysis and the relationship between literature and the arts. He taught at the University of East Anglia (1967–69), Clare College, Cambridge (1969–76) and Queen Mary College, London.

Bowie was elected to the Christ's Mastership in 2002, after spending ten years as Marshal Foch Professor of French Literature and Fellow of All Souls College, Oxford. Before going on to the Faculty of Medieval and Modern Languages, University of Oxford, he held the Professorship of French Language and Literature at Queen Mary College (1976–92). While in London he was the Founding Director of the Institute of Romance Studies (1989–92), the School of Advanced Study, University of London. In December 2006, he vacated the Mastership because of ill health, and was made an Emeritus Fellow of Christ's. He was a Fellow of the British Academy and the Royal Society of Literature, a Member of the Academia Europaea, an Honorary Member of the Modern Language Association of America, and an Officier dans l'Ordre des Palmes académiques. He served as President of the Society for French Studies, the British Comparative Literature Association, and the Association of University Professors of French, and held a Visiting Professorship at the University of California, Berkeley and a Visiting Distinguished Professorship at the CUNY Graduate Center in New York.

His Proust Among The Stars (1998) won the 2001 Truman Capote Award for Literary Criticism.

References
 Clive Scott, 'Professor Malcolm Bowie' (Obituary), The Independent 5 Feb 2007.
 Michael Sheringham, 'Professor Malcolm Bowie' (Obituary), The Guardian 14 Feb 2007
 The Times 6 Feb 2007 (Obituary) 'Professor Malcolm Bowie'
 The Daily Telegraph 5 Feb 2007 (Obituary) 'Professor Malcolm Bowie'
 Bowie appears as a character, under his own name, in Stephen Henighan's novel The World of After.

1943 births
2007 deaths
English literary critics
Literary critics of French
Alumni of the University of Edinburgh
Alumni of the University of Sussex
Academics of the University of East Anglia
Fellows of Clare College, Cambridge
Academics of Queen Mary University of London
Fellows of All Souls College, Oxford
Masters of Christ's College, Cambridge
Fellows of the British Academy
Fellows of the Royal Society of Literature
Members of Academia Europaea
People from Aldeburgh
Marshal Foch Professors of French Literature
Scholars of French literature
 People educated at Woodbridge School